John Davidson may refer to:

Arts and entertainment
John Davidson (poet) (1857–1909), Scottish poet and playwright
John Davidson (actor) (1886–1968), American actor
John Davidson (entertainer) (born 1941), American television actor and game show host

Military
John Davidson (Royal Navy officer) (c. 1818–1881), English naval surgeon
John Wynn Davidson (1825–1881), U.S. Army major general
John F. Davidson (1908–1989), U.S. Navy admiral

Politics and law
John Davidson (Lower Canada politician) (died 1838), Canadian merchant, civil servant and politician
John S. Davidson (1846–1894), American politician, member of the Georgia State Senate
John Andrew Davidson (1852–1903), Canadian politician
John Davidson (British Army officer) (1876–1954), British major general and politician
J. C. C. Davidson (1889–1970), British politician
John James Davidson (1898–1976), British MP, 1935–1945
John Davidson (Illinois politician) (1924–2012), American politician
John Andrew Davidson, 2nd Viscount Davidson (1928–2012), British politician

Religion
John Davidson (reformer) (1549–1603) Scottish Presbyterian minister during the Scottish Reformation
John Davidson (minister) (1834–1881), Scottish Presbyterian minister and academic
John Davidson (British writer) (born 1944), English writer on mysticism and Christian origins
John Davidson (priest), Canadian Anglican priest

Sports
John Davidson (cricketer, born 1804) (1804–1898), English cricketer
John Davidson (rugby union) (1851–1919), Scottish rugby union player
Gordon Davidson (ice hockey) (John Gordon Davidson, 1918–2004), Canadian ice hockey player
John Davidson (ice hockey) (born 1953), Canadian NHL hockey player and executive
John Davidson (rugby league) (born 1961), Australian rugby player
John Davidson (cricketer, born 1964), Welsh cricketer

Others
John Davidson (antiquarian) (1725–1797), Scottish lawyer, publisher and antiquarian
John Davidson (traveller) (1797–1836), English traveler in Africa
John Ewen Davidson (1841–1923), English pioneer sugar planter and miller in Queensland
John Davidson (botanist) (1878–1970), Scottish-Canadian botanist
John Ogilvie Davidson (1892–1972), Canadian surveyor
John Davidson (chemical engineer) (1926–2019), British chemical engineer awarded a Royal Medal in 1999
John Davidson (Tourette syndrome campaigner) (born 1972/1973), Scottish subject of a BBC documentary John's Not Mad

See also
John Davison (disambiguation)
Davidson (name)